2005–06 Albanian Cup was the fifty-fourth season of Albania's annual cup competition. It began on 28 August 2005 with the preliminary round and ended on 10 May 2006 with the Final match. The winners of the competition qualified for the 2006-07 first qualifying round of the UEFA Europa League. Teuta were the defending champions, having won their third Albanian Cup last season. The cup was won by KF Tirana.

The rounds were played in a two-legged format similar to those of European competitions. If the aggregated score was tied after both games, the team with the higher number of away goals advanced. If the number of away goals was equal in both games, the match was decided by extra time and a penalty shootout, if necessary.

Preliminary round
Games were played on 28 August – 4 September 2005.

|}

First round
All fourteen teams of the 2004–05 Superliga and First Division entered in this round, along with Preliminary Round winners. Games were played on 20–27 September 2005.

|}

Second round
First legs were played on 19 October 2005 and the second legs were played on 26 October 2005.

|}

Quarter-finals
In this round entered the 8 winners from the previous round.

|}

Semi-finals
In this round entered the four winners from the previous round.

|}

Final

References

External links
 Official website 

Cup
2005–06 domestic association football cups
2005-06